The de Havilland DH.56 Hyena was a prototype British army cooperation aircraft of the 1920s. A single-engined biplane, the Hyena was designed against an RAF requirement, but was unsuccessful with only two being built, the Armstrong Whitworth Atlas being preferred.

Development and design
The DH.56 Hyena was developed to meet the requirements of Air Ministry Specification 30/24 for an Army Cooperation aircraft to equip Britain's Royal Air Force.  It was a development of de Havilland's earlier DH.42B Dingo, and like the Dingo, was a single-engined two-bay biplane carrying a crew of two.  It was armed with a forward-firing Vickers machine gun and a Lewis gun operated by the observer.  A hook to pick up messages was fitted beneath the fuselage, while the aircraft was also equipped for photography, artillery spotting, supply dropping and bombing.

The first Hyena flew on 17 May 1925, powered by a 385 hp (287 kW) Armstrong Siddeley Jaguar III radial engine. With this engine it was underpowered, and was quickly re-engined with a 422 hp (315 kW) Jaguar IV before it was submitted for official testing (which was against the requirements of Specification 20/25, which had superseded 30/24).  The two prototype Hyenas were tested against the other competitors for the RAF's orders, the Armstrong Whitworth Atlas, the Bristol Bloodhound  and the Vickers Vespa, including field evaluation with No. 4 Squadron RAF. Handling close to the ground was found to be difficult, with a poor view from the cockpit, and the orders went to the Atlas, with the Hyena being abandoned, being used for testing at the Royal Aircraft Establishment, Farnborough until 1928.

Specifications (Jaguar IV)

See also

Notes

References

Jackson, A.J. De Havilland Aircraft since 1909. London:Putnam, Third edition 1987. .
 Mason, Francis K. The British Bomber since 1914. London:Putnam, 1994. .

External links

De Havilland Hyena

1920s British bomber aircraft
Hyena